My Favorite Things is a 1965 studio album by the Dave Brubeck Quartet, of music by Richard Rodgers. The album peaked at 133 on the Billboard 200.

Reception

The album was reviewed by Scott Yanow at Allmusic who wrote that despite being recorded in session three years apart, the music "...has a strong unity about it due to the consistent performances of the veteran group". Yanow also wrote that "The Rodgers songs are treated with respect and swing. This comparatively gentle version of "My Favorite Things" would never be mistaken for John Coltrane's."

Track listing
''All music composed by Richard Rodgers, lyricists indicated
 "My Favorite Things" (Oscar Hammerstein II) - 2:57
 "Over and Over Again" (Lorenz Hart) - 4:07
 "Why Can't I?" (Hart) - 6:58
 "Little Girl Blue" (Hart) - 5:35
 "This Can't Be Love" (Hart) - 6:57
 "My Romance" (Hart) - 6:55
 "The Circus on Parade" (Hart) - 3:19
 "The Most Beautiful Girl in the World" (Hart) - 5:18

Personnel
Dave Brubeck - piano
Paul Desmond - alto saxophone
Gene Wright - double bass
Joe Morello - drums
Teo Macero - producer

References

1965 albums
Albums produced by Teo Macero
Columbia Records albums
Dave Brubeck albums
Richard Rodgers tribute albums